6-Hydroxykynurenic acid is a constituent of ginkgo and an amino acid. It is a derivative of kynurenic acid and has similarly been found to antagonize AMPA and NMDA, as well as their corresponding receptors.

See also
 Kynurenic acid

References

Carboxylic acids
Quinoline alkaloids
Phenols